Sparnon is a small hamlet in the parish of St Buryan on the Penwith peninsula in Cornwall, England, United Kingdom.

References

Hamlets in Cornwall
Penwith